Ekfeldt is a Swedish surname. Notable people with the surname include:

Jonas Ekfeldt (born 1971), Swedish music producer and singer
Tage Ekfeldt (1926–2005), Swedish Olympic runner

See also
Eckfeldt

Swedish-language surnames